John Russell Macomber (February 1, 1875 – May 11, 1955) was an American financer and sportsman.

Early life
Macomber was born on February 1, 1875, in Framingham, Massachusetts, to John F. and Helen A. Hunt Macomber. He attended public schools in Framingham and the Chauncey Hill School in Boston. In 1897 he graduated from the Massachusetts Institute of Technology.

Business career
In 1894, Macomber joined the banking firm of N. W. Harris & Co as a messenger. In 1909 he became a partner and in 1911 was named vice president. In 1916 the firm was succeeded by Harris, Forbes & Co. and Macomber was made president. In 1930, he became chairman of the board of directors. In 1931 the business was consolidated with Chase Securities to become Chase, Harris, Forbes Corporation. In 1934, Chase, Harris, Forbes dissolved its banking affiliates and Macomber became chairman of the First Boston Corporation. He retired from the board on December 31, 1947.

Macomber also served as a director or trustee of a number of companies, including First National Bank of Boston, Harris Trust and Savings Bank, Bankers Trust, the International Paper Company, Chase National Bank, United Shoe Machinery Co., and Puget Sound Power and Light. In 1927, Macomber was named chairman of the board of directors for the planned sports arena at North Station which became the Boston Garden. The board, which consisted of members of the Madison Square Garden Corporation, the Boston and Maine Corporation, and a number of Boston businessmen, also included Tex Rickard, Homer Loring, George Hannauer, Edward Lawrence Logan, Louis K. Liggett, Charles F. Adams, Huntington Hardwick, and Joseph Gilman. In 1934, the Madison Square Garden Corporation sold its interest to the Boston Arena Corporation and Macomber served on the Board of the new Boston Garden-Arena Corporation.

Public service
During World War I, Macomber served as chairman of the New England Liberty Loan committee and of Metropolitan Boston trade in the United War Work campaign. From 1919 to 1920, Macomber served as President of the Boston Chamber of Commerce. On September 3, 1920, Massachusetts State Treasurer Fred J. Burrell resigned following an investigation by a special legislative committee and Governor Calvin Coolidge appointed Macomber, Albert P. Langtry, and Henry A. Wyman to administer the office until a successor could be confirmed. In 1922, Macomber was elected a life member of the board of trustees at Tufts College. In 1926 he was named chairman of Massachusetts General Hospital's finance campaign committee.

Horse racing

Thoroughbred racing
Macomber was a longtime supporter of Thoroughbred racing and breeding. One of his horses, Petee-Wrack, ran in the 1928 Kentucky Derby and Preakness Stakes and won the 1928 Travers Stakes, 1929 Twin City Handicap, and 1930 Suburban Handicap. Petee-Wrack's offspring included, Widener Challenge Cup winner Columbiana, Grand National winner Brother Jones, and Maryland Hunt Cup winners Peterski and Pine Rep.

Macomber was the first president of the Eastern Horse Club, which conducted races at The Country Club and Raceland from 1926 to 1935. After parimutuel betting was legalized in Massachusetts, Macomber, Charles Adams, Bayard Tuckerman, Jr., and members of the Eastern Horse Club formed the Eastern Racing Association to open a thoroughbred race track in East Boston. At Macombers suggestion, the new track was named Suffolk Downs. Beginning in 1956, the closing race of Suffolk Downs' spring meeting was called the John R. Macomber Memorial Handicap.

Steeplechase
In 1928, Macomber's horse Bridge, won the inaugural Master of Foxhounds Association Steeplechase for hunters in front of a crowd of 10,000 at Pimlico Race Course. In 1929, Coronel won The Country Club Grand National steeplechase race.

Raceland
Macomber was a lifelong resident of Framingham. He lived with his mother in the family home for 50 years. After her death, he developed Raceland, which served as his home as well as a venue for horse racing, dog shows, and automobile shows. Beginning in 1927, Macomber opened Raceland to the public free of charge for one day of the annual horse meet. In 1930, the stable and clubhouse were destroyed by fire, but he replaced the buildings in time for the next year's meet.

Macomber died on May 11, 1955, at the age of 80. His will provided for the continuance of Raceland to care for his horses and dogs for the rest of their lives. Never married, he left the bulk of his estate to the Massachusetts Society for the Prevention of Cruelty to Animals and Massachusetts General Hospital.

References

1875 births
1955 deaths
American financiers
American philanthropists
American racehorse owners and breeders
Massachusetts Institute of Technology alumni
Massachusetts Republicans
People associated with the MSPCA-Angell
People from Framingham, Massachusetts
Suffolk Downs executives